Sydney Sipho Sepamla (22 September 1932 – 9 January 2007) was a contemporary South African poet and novelist.

Biography
Born in a township near Krugersdorp, Sipho Sepamla lived most of his life in Soweto. He studied teaching at Pretoria Normal College and published his first volume of poetry, Hurry Up to It!, in 1975. During this period he was active in the Black Consciousness movement and his 1977 book The Soweto I Love, partly a response to the Soweto Uprising of 16 June 1976, was banned by the apartheid regime. He was a founder of the Federated Union of Black Artists (now the Fuba Academy of Arts) and editor of the literary magazine New Classic and the theatre magazine S'ketsh.

He published several volumes of poetry and novels. He received the Thomas Pringle Award (1977) and the French Ordre des Arts et des Lettres for his writing. More recently in democratic South Africa he was a member of the government's Arts and Culture Task Group.

Works
Poetry
Hurry Up to It! (Donker, 1975)
The Soweto I Love (1977)
Selected poems (Donker, 1984)
From Gorée to Soweto (1988)

Novels
The Root is One (1979)
A Ride on the Whirlwind (1981)

External links
2 poems

References

1932 births
20th-century South African poets
2007 deaths
South African male novelists
University of Pretoria alumni
20th-century South African novelists
South African male poets
International Writing Program alumni
20th-century South African male writers